Old Colony Lines may refer to:
Old Colony Lines (MBTA), commuter rail lines
Old Colony Railroad, New York, New Haven and Hartford Railroad subsidiary